Phenagoniates is a genus of fish in the family Characidae. It contains the single species Phenagoniates macrolepis, which is found in Colombia, Panama and Venezuela.  It is sometimes kept as an aquarium fish.

References
 

Characidae
Monotypic freshwater fish genera
Freshwater fish of Colombia
Fish of Panama
Fish of Venezuela
Fish described in 1913